The main campus of Temple University is in North Philadelphia about  north of Center City. It occupies ; an estimated 12,626 students live on or near it. Events for students and the public include concerts, performances, clubs, exhibits and lectures.

The campus has notable landmarks which have accrued over its history. O'Connor Plaza surrounds the Founder's Garden between Polett Walk and Liacouras Walk. The bronze statue of an owl, the university's mascot, is a popular photo spot at the heart of main campus.

The Founder's Garden near Liacouras Walk, is the burial place of Russell Conwell, founder and 38-year president of Temple. A former Yale student, Civil War captain, Boston lawyer, and Philadelphia minister, Conwell used the income from his famous “Acres of Diamonds” speech to fund Temple as a place where working-class Philadelphians might receive higher education. It has been estimated that Conwell, who died at 82, helped more than 90,000 men and women pursue higher education. A bust of Conwell marks his grave. Another green area on campus is the Johnny Ring Garden. It is located near the faculty staff dining 'Diamond Club', and celebrates Conwell and Johnny Ring.

The surrounding plaza and grassy area, the largest "green space" on the urban campus, are commonly called "the beach". The area is a meeting place and hangout location for students and their protests, promotions, speeches, political campaigning, and charity drives. It also hosts various official events such as Spring Fling.

Residence halls
Students can live in several on-campus housing units: Morgan Hall, Johnson and Hardwick Residence Halls, James S. White Residence Hall, 1940 Residence Hall, 1300 Residence Hall, and Temple Towers Residence Hall.

Johnson and Hardwick Halls

The Johnson and Hardwick Residence Halls are 11-floor high-rise facilities that are used as the traditional residence halls on the Main Campus. The buildings house around 1,000 Temple students every year. The Louis J. Esposito Dining Center is on the ground level of the Johnson and Hardwick Halls near the north end of Main Campus. The cafeteria is commonly referred to as J&H after the residence halls. The Esposito Dining Center is one of three major cafeterias on campus. Johnson & Hardwick is home to three Living Learning Communities including Performing and Cinematic Arts, Major Exploration, and School of Media and Communication. Since 2006, the rooms and bathrooms in Johnson and Hardwick Residential Halls have been renovated. Restorations in 2010 included the renovation of a lobby with new entry points, security stations, office space, and lounge space. Most recently in the summer of 2017, both interior and exterior renovations to the residence halls were completed.

James S. White Hall

White Hall is a four-story complex that opened in the fall of 1993 and houses 558 newly admitted first-year students in two-person and four-person suites with private baths. It also includes two open-air courtyards, areas for TV viewing, exercising, and studying. White Hall is also home to three Living Learning Communities: Innovate and Create, Leadership, and Residential Organization for Community Service (ROCS).

1940 Residence Hall

470 first- and second-year students live in 1940 Residence Hall, opened in the fall of 1999. Residents live in two-person and four-person suites with private baths. Residents of “1940” enjoy game-rooms, a TV lounge, a multipurpose room for programming, and many study and social areas. In addition, 1940 hosts several Living Learning Communities: Architecture & Environmental Design, College of Engineering, Healthy Lifestyles, School of Sports, Tourism and Hospitality Management, Sustainability, and Tyler School of Art.

1300 Residence Hall

Opened in the fall of 2001, 1300 North and South accommodates up to 1044 newly admitted, returning, and transfer Main Campus students in suites on the first three floors and in apartments on the top two floors of the complex. 1300 is also home to the Honor's Program and the Leadership and Service Living Learning Communities. Residents of 1300 enjoy a TV lounge, a game room, and study and social areas. 1300 also contains several classrooms for Honors students.

Morgan Hall[s]

A mixed-use residential, retail, and dining facility, the Mitchell and Hilarie Morgan Residence Hall and Dining Complex, opened in July 2013. On the corner of Broad Street and Cecil B. Moore Avenue, steps from the Broad Street Subway Line, the site contains three buildings surrounding a large terrace, and is designed to house nearly 1,300 students. The tallest of the buildings is the 27-floor Morgan Hall North, which is situated on the North end of the site. It contains 24 floors of residential space for both first-year experience students (transfers and freshmen) as well as returning students (sophomores, juniors, and seniors), a top floor event space, and retail space on the ground level. Connected to Morgan Hall North is the Dining Hall building, which runs along Broad Street and provides students with 5 dining options. Morgan Hall South is ten floors tall and houses first-year students, or freshmen. Both Morgan North and South are notable in that unlike other suite-style residence halls at Temple University, the rooms also include small kitchenettes with a cooktop, full fridge, and microwave. The suites  include two bedrooms that share a common living area and private bathrooms. Both residence halls feature floor-to-ceiling windows covering the entire side of the building to provide views of the campus, Center City, and allow for extensive natural light to enter into all interior spaces of the building.

Temple Towers

This six-story complex houses approximately 658 second-year and transfer students and consists of two towers, East and West. This residence hall features three-, six-, and seven-person bedroom apartments, all with private bathrooms and fully equipped kitchens. Bedroom furniture, desks and chairs, and living room furniture are provided. Residents at Temple Towers have the option of choosing to be on the meal plan. Temple Towers is also home to the Global Living Learning Communities program.

Temple Towers offers a game room, social lounges (with a fireplace), study lounges, a TV lounge, a bike storage space, and computer stations with printing.

Graduate housing

Podiatry Housing is a seven-story apartment building at 8th and Cherry Street in Center City Philadelphia.

Former housing
Peabody Hall (Demolished)
The Peabody Residence Hall was another traditionally styled dormitory on the Main Campus. In 2006, the building celebrated its 50th anniversary. Peabody Hall was originally designed as a women's residence hall with a campus cafeteria in the basement. The residence hall building structure had undergone many renovations to better serve modern students including a study/conference room lounge, game room, computer lab, kitchen, new windows, and air conditioning. The Gertrude Peabody Residence Hall was also known to have been built on land that once occupied one of Russell Conwell's, Temple University's founder, original homes. Announced before winter break in the 2017-2018 academic year, the University demolished Peabody Hall. A new, multi-purpose building is being explored to fill the location where Peabody stood. As of October 2019 Temple University has converted the area into a grassy area for students.

 Triangle Apartment complex (demolished)
The Temple University graduate and family housing unit was the Triangle Apartment Complex, located on the main campus. The complex consisted of converted brownstones. Each building had five units. Minors residing with graduate student parents/guardians were zoned to the School District of Philadelphia, with specific zoned schools being Tanner Duckrey School (K-8) and Simon Gratz High School. In 2010 the university proposed banning children from living in the Triangle complex. The university later rescinded the plan. In 2014 the university announced plans to demolish the facility.

Public transportation
The Cecil B. Moore station of the Broad Street Line subway is located close by at Broad Street and Cecil B. Moore Avenue. The C, 3, and 23 bus routes also stop at the Cecil B. Moore station. The Temple University station serves 13 different commuter rail lines, and is located at the eastern end of the campus at 10th and Berks Street.

References

Temple University